Barangdi  is a village development committee in Palpa District in the Lumbini Zone of southern Nepal. At the time of the 1991 Nepal census it had a population of 2475 people living in 470 individual households. It is surrounded by 3 other VDCs like Khanigaun from west and north, Chappani from east and north and Tansen Municipality in south.

References

Populated places in Palpa District